Lake Burullus is a brackish water lake in the Nile Delta in Egypt, the name coming from Burullus town (from Ancient Greek παράλιος, "coast, seaside" or ⲛⲓⲕⲉϫⲱⲟⲩ Nikejow). It is located in Kafr el-Sheikh Governorate east of Rosetta, bordered by the Mediterranean Sea in the north and agricultural land to the south.

History
In the early Islamic period, the port of Burullus was situated near the mouth of the lake (the place where it was connected to the sea through a small opening). Burullus port functioned as one of the defensive frontier settlements of the Nile Delta coast. An island settlement within the lake called Nastaru lent its name to the lake as a whole. Canals connected the lake to the Rosetta branch of the Nile. At this time the lake was growing and expanding southwards as a result of changes in fluvial deposition and generalized substrate subsidence.

Geography

The lake's north shore is formed primarily of salt marshes and mudflats, while the south is mainly reed beds. The dominant lake vegetation is Potamogeton.

Hydrology
The lake receives drainage waters from surrounding agricultural land and fresh water from the Brembal Canal. It is considered to be a lake and wetlands site of International importance for birds under the Ramsar Convention. Agriculture drainage water accounts for 97% of the total inflow to the lake (3.9 billion m3 per year), followed by rain water (2%) and groundwater (1%). 16% of the lake's water evaporates and 84% flows to the sea.

Wildlife

According to a Biodiversity Report of the Egyptian Environmental Affairs Agency 33 species of fish, 23 species of reptiles, 112 species of birds, and 18 species of mammals live in and around the lake. Fish species declined from 52 recorded at the beginning of the 20th century, mostly due to the inflow of agricultural drainage into the lake resulting in lower salinity.

References

External links
 
 Ministry of Environment Egyptian Environmental Affairs Agency - Natural Protectorates Description

National parks of Egypt
Burullus
Kafr El Sheikh Governorate
Ramsar sites in Egypt
Nile Delta